MTV Party To Go '98 was the eleventh album in the MTV Party To Go series.  The album was certified gold on February 23, 1998, by the RIAA.

Track listing
 "Ladies Night" (Cleen Radio Remix) – Lil' Kim
 "Return of the Mack" (C&J X-tended Radio Edit) - Mark Morrison
 "Quit Playing Games (With My Heart)" (Album Version) - Backstreet Boys
 "Snoop's Upside Ya Head" (Radio Edit) - Snoop Doggy Dogg
 "I'll Be" (Radio Edit) – Foxy Brown featuring Jay-Z
 "Ooh La La" (Extended Radio Edit) - Coolio
 "Block Rockin' Beats" (Single Version) - The Chemical Brothers
 "Pony" (Extended Mix)- Ginuwine
 "On & On" (Clean Version) - Erykah Badu
 "Been There, Done That" (Radio Edit) - Dr. Dre
 "If Your Girl Only Knew" (Single Mix) - Aaliyah
 "No Diggity" (Album Version) - Blackstreet featuring Dr. Dre
 "Steelo" (Album Edit) - 702
 "In My Bed" (So So Def Mix) - Dru Hill

References

Mtv Party To Go 11
1997 compilation albums
Tommy Boy Records compilation albums
Dance music compilation albums
Hip hop compilation albums
Rhythm and blues compilation albums
Pop compilation albums